The Turkish Ice Skating Federation (TBPF) is the main ice skating governing body overlooking speed skating, figure skating, ice dancing, synchronized skating and curling. 
in Turkey.

The Turkish Ice Skating Federation was founded in 2006. It is a member of the Turkish Olympic Committee and the International Skating Union (ISU). Currently, the federation's president is Burhan Kurtuluş.

See also
 Turkey men's national curling team
 Turkey women's national curling team

References

External links

Ice skating
Sports organizations established in 2006
Organizations based in Ankara
Federation
Federation
Federation
Turkey
Turkey
Turkey
2006 establishments in Turkey